High Inergy was an American R&B and soul girl group who found fame on Motown Records in the late 1970s. They are best known for the hit song, "You Can't Turn Me Off (In the Middle of Turning Me On)".

History
High Inergy started in 1976 when the four founding singers were discovered by Gwen Gordy Fuqua during a Bicentennial show in Pasadena, California. The members of the group included lead singer Vernessa Mitchell, her sister Barbara Mitchell, Linda Howard and  Michelle Martin (or Rumph). The Mitchell sisters were singers, while the remaining members were known primarily for their dancing.

Fashioned after Martha and the Vandellas and the Supremes, the group was signed to Motown's Gordy subsidiary in 1977. They quickly found success with the R&B/pop hit, "You Can't Turn Me Off (In the Middle of Turning Me On)," which reached R&B number 2 and U.S. number 12.

The group became a trio when Vernessa left after the second album to pursue a career in gospel music. Barbara Mitchell replaced her sister as lead singer.

The group would score a total of nine R&B hits before disbanding for solo  careers in 1984.

Group member Linda Howard died on December 9, 2012.

Collaborations
On their 1980 album, Hold On, the group collaborated with labelmates Switch on the track "Hold On to My Love." The song features Switch member Bobby DeBarge as the male lead vocalist. DeBarge also produced and co-wrote the song.

Smokey Robinson performed two duets with Barbara Mitchell on Groove Patrol, High Inergy's last album, which was released in 1983.

Discography

Albums

Singles

References

American girl groups
American soul musical groups
Motown artists